Christopher Mark Newman is an English field hockey player and Indoor field hockey International.

Education
Newman was educated at Abingdon School and was captain of the first eleven.

Hockey career
He joined Reading Hockey Club and was made the club captain in 2014. An international call up arrived in 2014 when he was selected as part of the team that took part in the EuroHockey Indoor Nations Championship in Vienna, Austria. He represented England again in the 2016 EuroHockey Indoor Nations Championship II in Espinho, Portugal assisting England to a third place finish.

See also
 List of Old Abingdonians

References

English male field hockey players
People educated at Abingdon School
Living people
1990 births
Place of birth missing (living people)
Reading Hockey Club players
Men's Feldhockey Bundesliga players
Der Club an der Alster players